Caroline Robinson Jones (February 15, 1942 - June 28, 2001) was among the first female African-American advertising figures.

Life
Caroline Robinson Jones was born in Benton Harbor, Michigan on February 15, 1942. She graduated from the University of Michigan in Ann Arbor, Michigan and went on to work for advertising agencies such as J. Walter Thompson and BBDO. Jones later founded agencies that specialized in minority advertising, making her among the first to do so. She helped found Caroline Jones Advertising, Zebra Associates, and Mingo-Jones, among the first agencies to be created by primarily African American executives and also among the first to focus on minority advertising.
 Clients of Caroline Jones Advertising included American Express, the National Urban League, and Miller High Life. In 1979, her agency developed the slogan "We Do Chicken Right!" for Kentucky Fried Chicken (now KFC). Jones died of breast cancer in 2001.

References

1942 births
2001 deaths
University of Michigan alumni
American advertising executives
20th-century American businesswomen
20th-century American businesspeople
Women in advertising
People from Benton Harbor, Michigan
Businesspeople from Michigan
African-American businesspeople
20th-century African-American women
20th-century African-American people